The 2017 Piala Sumbangsih was the 32nd edition of the Piala Sumbangsih, an annual football match played between the winners of the previous season's Malaysia Super League and Malaysia Cup. The game was played between the Kedah FA, winners of the 2016 Malaysia Cup, and Johor Darul Ta'zim F.C., champions of the 2016 Malaysia Super League.

Match details

Source:

Winners

References

Piala Sumbangsih seasons
2017 in Malaysian football